Rio Grande is a 1920 American silent Western film directed by Edwin Carewe and starring Rosemary Theby, Allan Sears, and Georgie Stone.

Cast
 Rosemary Theby as Maria Inez 
 Allan Sears as Danny O'Neil 
 Georgie Stone as Danny O'Neil at 8 years old 
 Peaches Jackson as Maria Inez, 6 years 
 Hector V. Sarno as Felipe Lopez 
 Adele Farrington as Alice Lopez 
 Arthur Edmund Carewe as Don Jose Alvarado
 Harry Duffield as Father O'Brien

References

Bibliography
 Goble, Alan. The Complete Index to Literary Sources in Film. Walter de Gruyter, 1999.

External links

 
 

1920 films
1920 Western (genre) films
Films directed by Edwin Carewe
Pathé Exchange films
American black-and-white films
Silent American Western (genre) films
1920s English-language films
1920s American films